The first Olympics that Bhutan participated in was the 1984 Los Angeles Olympics.
For each Summer Olympic Games from then until 2008, Bhutan was only represented by archers. Archery is the national sport of Bhutan. The first non-archer to compete for Bhutan was Kunzang Choden in the 2012 Olympics. She competed in the women's 10m air-rifle event. The 2012 Bhutan team contained no men. Bhutan has never won an Olympic Medal. In spite of being very mountainous, it has never competed in the Winter Games.

The Bhutan Olympic Committee was formed in 1983 and recognized by the IOC the same year.

Medal tables

Medals by Summer Games

See also
 List of flag bearers for Bhutan at the Olympics
 Archery in Bhutan

References

External links
 
 
 

 
Olympics